Elections to Purbeck District Council were held on 1 May 2008. Nine of the twenty-four seats on the council were up for election and the council stayed under no overall control. Overall turnout was 44.86%.

A big issue in the election was housing with much criticism of plans to build over five thousand homes in the district by 2026. The nominations for the election saw an unusual event when Liberal Democrat candidate Alexandra Brenton signed the nomination papers for her friend and Labour Party candidate Selby Bennett. Two seats were contested in Lytchett Matravers after Liberal Democrat councillor Michael Peacock stood down in February.

The results saw the Liberal Democrat party gained Wareham and Wool wards from the Conservative Party to pull level on the Council. The Conservative party took Swanage South from Liberal Democrat Colin Bright who had defected from the Conservatives the previous month.

After the election, the composition of the council was
Conservative 11
Liberal Democrat 11
Independent 2

Election result

Ward results

References

2008 Purbeck election result
Declaration of Results of Polls - District and Town Council Elections held on 1 May 2008

2008
2008 English local elections
2000s in Dorset